Marsham is a surname. Notable people with the surname include:

 Dame Joan Marsham (1888–1972), British philanthropist
 John Marsham (cricketer) (1842–1926), English clergyman and cricketer
 Robert Marsham (1708–1797), founder of phenology
 Thomas Marsham (died 1819), English entomologist
 Walter Marsham (1869–1945), English cricketer, the son of John Marsham

A family of cricketers:
 Algernon Marsham (1919–2004)
 C. H. B. Marsham (1879–1928)
 C. D. B. Marsham (1835–1915)
 Charles Marsham (1829–1901)
 George Marsham (1849–1927)
 Robert Marsham (cricketer) (1833–1913)

The family name of the Earl of Romney and their predecessors the Baronets of Cuckston and Barons Romney:
 Sir John Marsham, 1st Baronet (1602–1685)
 Sir Robert Marsham, 4th Baronet (1650–1703)
 Robert Marsham, 1st Baron Romney (1685–1724)
 Charles Marsham, 1st Earl of Romney (1744–1811)
 Charles Marsham, 2nd Earl of Romney (1777–1845)
 Charles Marsham, 3rd Earl of Romney (1808–1874)
 Charles Marsham, 4th Earl of Romney (1841–1905)
 Michael Marsham, 7th Earl of Romney (1910–2004)
 Julian Marsham, 8th Earl of Romney (born 1948)

See also
Marsham, Norfolk
Marshman